{{DISPLAYTITLE:C4H6O2}}
The molecular formula C4H6O2 may refer to:

 1,4-Butynediol
 Butyrolactones
 β-Butyrolactone
 γ-Butyrolactone
 Crotonic acid
 Diacetyl
 Diepoxybutane
 1,4-Dioxene
 Isocrotonic acid
 Methacrylic acid
 Methyl acrylate
 Succinaldehyde
 Vinyl acetate
 Butenoic acid